William Pember Reeves (10 February 1857 – 16 May 1932) was a New Zealand politician, cricketer, historian and poet who promoted social reform.

Early life and career 
Reeves's parents were William Reeves, who was a journalist and politician, and Ellen Reeves, née Pember. They had migrated from Britain to Canterbury Province in 1857, arriving three weeks before he was born.

He was educated at a private prep school in Christchurch, the local high school and, from 1867 to 1874, Christ's College Grammar School. Before entering politics, Reeves was a lawyer and journalist.  He was editor of the Canterbury Times in 1885 and the Lyttelton Times (1889–1891).

Cricket
Reeves played in five first-class cricket matches for Canterbury from 1879 to 1888. A batsman, his highest score was 54, Canterbury's top score in the match, when Canterbury beat Otago by four runs in February 1883.

Political career 

Reeves represented the Christchurch electorate of St Albans in Parliament from 1887 to 1890, and then Christchurch from 1890 to 1896, when he resigned to take up the post of Agent General. During the premierships of John Ballance (1891–93) and Richard Seddon (1893–1906) he served as Minister of Labour (1892–96), Minister of Education (1891–96), Minister of Justice (1891–92, 1893, 1895–96) and Commissioner of Stamp Duties (1892–96).  As Minister of Labour he introduced the Industrial Conciliation and Arbitration Act 1894 and the Undesirable Immigrants Exclusion Bill, which, if it had been passed, would have barred poor and Asian immigrants from the country. His opposition to the entry of those he considered "undesirable" immigrants earned him the nickname "Undesirable Bill" Reeves.

In London 
In January 1896 Reeves left New Zealand for London, where he was Agent General (1896–1905) and High Commissioner (1905–08). While he was in Britain Reeves became a friend of a number of left-wing intellectuals, such as George Bernard Shaw, H. G. Wells, and Sidney and Beatrice Webb, all leading members of the Fabian Society.  He was also a member of the Coefficients dining club of social reformers.

Reeves became Director of the London School of Economics (1908–19) and President of the Anglo-Hellenic League (1913–25). He also headed the committee organising the First Universal Races Congress in London in 1911. Finally, he was chairman of the board of the National Bank of New Zealand from 1917 to 1931.

Reeves's more influential writings include his history of New Zealand, The Long White Cloud (1898) and State Experiments in Australia and New Zealand (1902).  He also published a number of poems, such as "The Passing of the Forest" and "A Colonist in his Garden".

Reeves married Magdalen Stuart Robison in 1885. She was a feminist who later joined the Fabian Society. They had two daughters, the feminist writer Amber Reeves (born 1887) and Beryl (born 1889), and one son, Fabian Pember Reeves (1895–1917), who was killed in the First World War, aged 21, as a Flight Lieutenant in the RNAS.

Reeves three times declined offers of a knighthood.

Works
 
 
 
 State Experiments in Australia & New Zealand. London: Grant Richards. 1902.

See also
 List of Canterbury representative cricketers

Notes

References

External links

 
 Biography in the 1966 Encyclopaedia of New Zealand
 
 
 , or at the New Zealand Electronic Text Centre
 "The Passing of the Forest" at the New Zealand Electronic Text Centre

|-

|-

|-

1857 births
1932 deaths
New Zealand Liberal Party MPs
20th-century New Zealand historians
19th-century New Zealand lawyers
People from Lyttelton, New Zealand
Members of the Cabinet of New Zealand
New Zealand education ministers
Labour ministers of New Zealand
Members of the New Zealand House of Representatives
People associated with the London School of Economics
People educated at Christ's College, Christchurch
New Zealand MPs for Christchurch electorates
High Commissioners of New Zealand to the United Kingdom
Members of the Fabian Society
19th-century New Zealand politicians
Canterbury cricketers
Cricketers from Christchurch
19th-century New Zealand historians
Justice ministers of New Zealand
William Pember